The 1972 Swiss League Cup was the inaugural Swiss League Cup competition. It was played in the summer of 1972 as a pre-season tournament to the 1972–73 Swiss football season. It was won by FC Basel who defeated FC Winterthur 4–1 in the final.

Round 1

|}

Quarter-finals

|}

Semi-finals

|}

Final
The final took place on 11 November 1972 at Letzigrund in Zürich

|}

References
 Swiss League Cup results at rsssf.com

1972
League Cup